The seventh series of Dancing with the Stars premiered on 29 April 2018 on Three, and was hosted by Dai Henwood and Sharyn Casey. Camilla Sacre-Dallerup, Julz Tocker, and Rachel White are the series' judges; Sacre-Dullerup serves as the head judge. Sam Hayes won the competition on 1 July 2018.

Cast

Couples

Scorecard

Red numbers indicate the couples with the lowest score for each week.
Green numbers indicate the couples with the highest score for each week.
 indicates the couples eliminated that week.
 indicates the returning couple that finished in the bottom two.
 the returning couple that was the last to be called safe.
 indicates the winning couple.
 indicates the runner-up couple.
 indicates the couple who placed third.

Average score chart
This table only counts for dances scored on a 30-point scale.

Highest and lowest scoring performances
The best and worst performances in each dance according to the judges' 30-point scale are as follows:

Couples' highest and lowest scoring dances
Scores are based upon a potential 30-point maximum (team dances are excluded).

Weekly scores
Individual judges' scores in the charts below (given in parentheses) are listed in this order from left to right: Rachel White, Camilla Sacre-Dallerup, Julz Tocker.

Week 1 
Running order (Night 1)

Running order (Night 2)

Week 2: Top 40 Night 
Running order (Night 1)

Running order (Night 2)

Week 3: My Jam Night 
Running order (Night 1)

Running order (Night 2)

Week 4: Musical Icons 
Running order (Night 1)

Running order (Night 2)

Week 5: Prohibition Party 
Running order (Night 1)

Running order (Night 2)

Week 6: Trio Week 
Running order (Night 1)

Running order (Night 2)

Week 7: Latin Night 
Running order (Night 1)

Running order (Night 2)

Week 8 
Running order (Night 1 - Winter Solstice) 

Running order (Night 2 - Team Dance)

Week 9: 90s/Most Memorable Year Week (Semi-finals) 
Running order

Week 10: Grand Final 
Running order

Dance chart

 Highest scoring dance
 Lowest scoring dance

References

series 7
2018 New Zealand television seasons